Jonathan James May (born 1 April 1990) is a professional rugby union player for Gloucester in Premiership Rugby and for the  national team. He plays as a winger and is known for his speed and try scoring. 

He began his senior career at Gloucester, and also played for Moseley on loan. He moved to Leicester Tigers in 2017 and returned to Gloucester in July 2020. 

Since making his debut in 2013 he has won 69 caps for England, and is their second top try scorer.

Early life
May was born in Chiseldon, Wiltshire. He studied at St Francis before he attended The Ridgeway School and Sixth Form College. As a child, May spent time playing and training at Wootton Bassett RFC in their Mini & Junior teams. He then studied at Hartpury College, where he was a member of Hartpury College R.F.C., coached by Allan Lewis in a team that included future Wales and Lions wing Alex Cuthbert.

Club career
After joining Gloucester's rugby academy, he made his first start for Gloucester Rugby in a pre-season friendly against Bath on 15 August 2009, and the next weekend he scored a try against Connacht after he had come off the bench. His first taste of first team action came in the Heineken Cup when he replaced Charlie Sharples against Newport Gwent Dragons and just over a month later he made his first start against London Wasps in the Anglo-Welsh Cup, playing on the wing. 

On 20 February 2010, May was a late replacement for Gloucester's match against Leicester Tigers at Welford Road Stadium after Fuimaono-Sapolu pulled out with a 'dead leg'. Although Gloucester lost, May played well and scored a try on his Premiership debut. May made 2 more starts for Gloucester during the remainder of the season against London Wasps and Northampton Saints.

In 2009-10 he also played for Championship club Moseley on loan. 

In January 2012 May was called up to the England Saxons, which he celebrated by scoring two tries from full-back for at Kingsholm against Toulouse in the Heineken Cup. May made his debut off the bench against Scotland, and made his first start against Ireland the following week. In March 2012 May was named as the inaugural winner of the LV= Breakthrough Player Award. May was named Gloucester's Young Player of the Year for 2011/2012, and his stunning solo effort against Harlequins was named Try-of-the-Season at the Aviva Premiership Awards. In December 2012, May signed a two-year contract extension with Gloucester until the end of the 2014–15 season. On 24 October 2014, May signed a new long-term contract with Gloucester Rugby.

In 2017 it was announced he would be joining Leicester Tigers in a swap deal with Ed Slater, after activating a little known clause in his Gloucester contract. May started his Leicester career strongly, scoring 9 tries in his first 8 appearances and earning the club's player of the month award.

After three seasons at Leicester, in April 2020 it was announced that May would return to Gloucester. He has since agreed a long-term contract.

International career
May played for England's U20s in 2010 as a centre.

He was selected for the senior England tour of South Africa in June 2012, scoring two tries in England's 57–31 win over Sharks. May won his first international cap during England's 2013 summer Tour against Argentina in the second Test which England won 51–26. On 9 January 2014, May was called up for the 2014 Six Nations Championship where he was in the starting fifteen against France, Scotland, Ireland, Wales and Italy. 
May started in the first test against the All Blacks in England's summer tour of New Zealand, but was dropped for the next two tests.

In the QBE Autumn Internationals, May played in all four test matches against New Zealand, South Africa, Samoa and Australia. May scored his first test try against New Zealand and scored twice against Samoa. 

In the 2019 Six Nations Championship, May scored six tries including a hat-trick against France and one apiece against Ireland, Italy and Scotland. During the 2019 Rugby World Cup, May earned his 50th cap in England's quarter final victory against Australia, scoring two tries. 

In February 2021, May became England's second highest try scorer, surpassing Will Greenwood and Ben Cohen after scoring his 32nd test try.

International tries

Test match record

References

External links
Gloucester Rugby Profile

1990 births
Living people
England international rugby union players
English rugby union players
Gloucester Rugby players
Gloucestershire County RFU players
Leicester Tigers players
Moseley Rugby Football Club players
Rugby union centres
Rugby union players from Wiltshire